Gastrointestinal perforation, also known as ruptured bowel, is a hole in the wall of part of the gastrointestinal tract. The gastrointestinal tract includes the esophagus, stomach, small intestine, and large intestine. Symptoms include severe abdominal pain and tenderness. When the hole is in the stomach or early part of the small intestine, the onset of pain is typically sudden while with a hole in the large intestine onset may be more gradual. The pain is usually constant in nature. Sepsis, with an increased heart rate, increased breathing rate, fever, and confusion may occur.

The cause can include trauma such as from a knife wound, eating a sharp object, or a medical procedure such as colonoscopy, bowel obstruction such as from a volvulus, colon cancer, or diverticulitis, stomach ulcers, ischemic bowel, and a number of infections including C. difficile. A hole allows intestinal contents to enter the abdominal cavity. The entry of bacteria results in a condition known as peritonitis or in the formation of an abscess. A hole in the stomach can also lead to a chemical peritonitis due to gastric acid. A CT scan is typically the preferred method of diagnosis; however, free air from a perforation can often be seen on plain X-ray.

Perforation anywhere along the gastrointestinal tract typically requires emergency surgery in the form of an exploratory laparotomy. This is usually carried out along with intravenous fluids and antibiotics. A number of different antibiotics may be used such as piperacillin/tazobactam or the combination of ciprofloxacin and metronidazole. Occasionally the hole can be sewn closed while other times a bowel resection is required. Even with maximum treatment the risk of death can be as high as 50%. A hole from a stomach ulcer occurs in about 1 per 10,000 people per year, while one from diverticulitis occurs in about 0.4 per 10,000 people per year.

Signs and symptoms

Signs and symptoms may include a sudden pain in the epigastrium to the right of the midline indicating the perforation of a duodenal ulcer, while a gastric ulcer perforation reveals itself by burning pain in epigastrium, with flatulence and dyspepsia.In intestinal perforation, pain starts from the site of perforation and spreads across the abdomen.

Gastrointestinal perforation results in severe abdominal pain intensified by movement, nausea, vomiting and hematemesis. Later symptoms include fever and or chills. In any case, the abdomen becomes rigid with tenderness and rebound tenderness. After some time the abdomen becomes silent and heart sounds can be heard all over. Patient stops passing flatus and motion, abdomen is distended.

The symptoms of esophageal rupture may include sudden onset of chest pain.

Causes

Underlying causes include gastric ulcers, duodenal ulcers, appendicitis, gastrointestinal cancer, diverticulitis, inflammatory bowel disease, superior mesenteric artery syndrome, trauma, vascular Ehlers–Danlos syndrome, and ascariasis. Typhoid fever, non-steroidal anti-inflammatory drugs, ingestion of corrosives may also be responsible.

Eating multiple magnets can also lead to perforation if the magnets attract and stick to one another through different loops of the intestine.

Diagnosis

On x-rays, gas may be visible in the abdominal cavity. Gas is easily visualized on x-ray while the patient is in an upright position. The perforation can often be visualised using computed tomography. White blood cells are often elevated.

Treatment

Surgical intervention is nearly always required in the form of exploratory laparotomy and closure of perforation with peritoneal wash. Occasionally they may be managed laparoscopically. A Graham patch may be used for duodenal perforations.

Conservative treatment including intravenous fluids, antibiotics, nasogastric aspiration and bowel rest is indicated only if the person is nontoxic and clinically stable.

References

External links 

 Gastrointestinal perforation—MedlinePlus

Medical emergencies
Diseases of intestines
Injuries of abdomen, lower back, lumbar spine and pelvis
Acute pain
Wikipedia medicine articles ready to translate
Wikipedia emergency medicine articles ready to translate